Pebble City is an unincorporated community located in Mitchell County, Georgia, United States.

Geography
County Line sits at the intersection of Georgia Highway 37 and Pebble City Road. Stage Coach Road, Sales City Road, and Antioch Road also lie in the area. The town's water sources are Lost Creek, and Rigsby Lake.

References 

Unincorporated communities in Georgia (U.S. state)
Unincorporated communities in Mitchell County, Georgia